Puro may refer to:

People
Alec Puro (born 1975), American musician and composer
Olavi Puro (1918–1999), Finnish World War II flying ace
Teuvo Puro (1884–1956), Finnish actor and filmmaker

Other
Puroresu, professional wrestling in Japan
 Puro, a cigar completely made of tobacco produced in only one country

See also
Pura (disambiguation)
Pure (disambiguation)

Finnish-language surnames